The 2000–01 season was Colchester United's 59th season in their history and their third successive season in the third tier of English football, the Second Division. Alongside competing in the Second Division, the club also participated in the FA Cup, the League Cup and the Football League Trophy.

The main story of the season was the sale of star striker Lomana LuaLua to Premier League side Newcastle United for £2.25m. The proceeds from the sale helped to secure the medium-term future of the club.

Steve Whitton's first full season in charge of the U's ended with a minor improvement on last season with a 17th position finish. In the cups, it was a familiar story to the preceding seasons, with a first round exit in the Football League Trophy and a second round defeat to Sheffield United in the League Cup. Colchester were again dumped out of the FA Cup by non-League opposition when Yeovil Town thrashed them 5–1 in the first round.

Season overview
After scoring 14 goals for Colchester in the previous season, the U's began to receive interest in Lomana LuaLua. After scoring a hat-trick against Queens Park Rangers in the League Cup, LuaLua made his transfer to Bobby Robson's Newcastle United for a fee of £2.25m in September. The deal proved to be a huge financial boost to the club that helped secure the medium-term future of Colchester United.

In the FA Cup, Colchester suffered another first round exit to non-League opposition when Yeovil Town comprehensively won 5–1 at Huish Park. In the Football League Trophy, Colchester lost in the first round to Cambridge United while Sheffield United beat the U's in the second round of the League Cup after the U's had overcome QPR in the first round.

In the league, Steve Whitton guided his side to 17th position, six points clear of the relegation places.

Players

Transfers

In

 Total spending:  ~ £15,000

Out

 Total incoming:  ~ £2,250,000

Loans in

Loans out

Match details

Second Division

League table

Results round by round

Matches

Football League Cup

FA Cup

Football League Trophy

Squad statistics

Appearances and goals

|-
!colspan="16"|Players who appeared for Colchester who left during the season

|}

Goalscorers

Disciplinary record

Clean sheets
Number of games goalkeepers kept a clean sheet.

Player debuts
Players making their first-team Colchester United debut in a fully competitive match.

See also
List of Colchester United F.C. seasons

References

General
Books

Websites

Specific

2000-01
English football clubs 2000–01 season
2000–01 Football League Second Division by team